The rufous-browed tyrannulet (Phylloscartes superciliaris) is a species of bird in the family Tyrannidae.

It is found in Talamancan montane forests as well as isolated mountainous areas of Colombia and the Serranía del Perijá (Venezuela). Its natural habitat is subtropical or tropical moist montane forests.

References

rufous-browed tyrannulet
Birds of the Talamancan montane forests
Birds of the Colombian Andes
Birds of the Sierra Nevada de Santa Marta
Birds of the Serranía del Perijá
rufous-browed tyrannulet
rufous-browed tyrannulet
rufous-browed tyrannulet
Taxonomy articles created by Polbot